= Katapaspanas =

Town in ancient Bithynia

Coordinates: 40°14′18″N 30°36′11″E

Katapaspanas was a town of ancient Bithynia, inhabited in Roman times.

Its site is located near Yukari Kınık, Asiatic Turkey.
